Blepharida rhois, also known as the sumac flea beetle, is a species of leaf beetle of the subfamily Galerucinae. The colour of the species is red, with white dots and yellow head. They feed on a variety of plants, primarily in the Anacardiaceae, but are most closely associated with Sumac.

References

Alticini
Beetles described in 1771
Taxa named by Johann Reinhold Forster